On 9 October 1999, a football match took place between Russia and Ukraine in Moscow at Luzhniki Stadium.  It was the final match for both nations in group 4 in the qualifying tournament for UEFA Euro 2000.

Overview
The match ended in a 1–1 score, which combined with other results left Ukraine in second place behind France.  Russia fell to third place and were eliminated from qualifying.  Ukraine qualified for a two-match play-off, which they lost to Slovenia.  In addition to the football ramifications, the match had a wider significance as a match between two neighboring former Soviet countries.  The match was attended by many Russian celebrities as well the Prime Minister, Vladimir Putin. This match, and the earlier match between the nations in Euro 2000 qualifying, which Ukraine won 3–2, remain the only times Russia and Ukraine have faced each other in official competition.

Entering the match, Russia needed a win to guarantee progression to the Euro 2000, while Ukraine only needed a draw to at least guarantee at least 2nd place and thus a play-off.

Needing a win, Russia was on the attack much of the game looking for a go-ahead goal. In the 75th minute Valeri Karpin finally opened the scoring with a powerful free kick. This appeared to provide Russia the result they needed, and Ukraine appeared to be heading out of qualifying.  However, in the 87th minute, Andriy Shevchenko took a long free kick sending the ball towards the Russian goal.  The shot appeared to be savable; however, Russian goalkeeper Aleksandr Filimonov was surprised by the effort and, trying to catch the ball, knocked it into the goal.

Match

Details

Aftermath
The two Euro 2000 qualifiers remain the only time that Russia and Ukraine have played each other in an international "A" match, and Ukraine won head-to-head series: one win and one draw.

After the start of the Russo-Ukrainian War in 2014, UEFA declared that representative teams from either nation at club and international level cannot play against each other outside of knockout competitions. On February 24, 2022, Russia invaded Ukraine, and four days later FIFA/UEFA together announced that all Russian teams are suspended until further notice. UEFA also terminated their deal with Gazprom effective immediately.

References

Ukraine, 1999
Russia, 1999
UEFA Euro 2000 qualifying
1999 in Russian football
1999–2000 in Ukrainian football
UEFA European Championship matches
October 1999 sports events in Europe
1999 in Moscow
Sports competitions in Moscow
Football in Moscow